The 2011–12 season of Eintracht Braunschweig began on 5 June with a first training session. It is the club's first season in the 2. Bundesliga after being promoted from the 3. Liga. Eintracht started the season successfully with wins over 1860 Munich and Alemannia Aachen, leading the league on the first and second matchday. In the end the club finished the season as 8th, never being in serious danger of relegation.

2. Bundesliga

1st Half of Season Matches

2nd Half of Season matches

DFB-Pokal

1st round

Friendlies

Players

Current squad

Transfers

In:

Out:

Management and coaching staff 

Since 12 May 2008 Torsten Lieberknecht is the manager of Eintracht Braunschweig.

References

External links 
Eintracht Braunschweig Official Website

Eintracht Braunschweig
Eintracht Braunschweig seasons